Robert M. Harling III (born November 12, 1951) is an American writer, producer and film director.

Biography

Early life
He was born in 1951 in Dothan, Alabama, one of three children of Robert M. Harling, Jr (1923-2019)., and Margaret Jones Harling (1923-2013). He graduated from Northwestern State University in Natchitoches, Louisiana, and obtained a J.D. degree from Tulane University Law School in New Orleans. While in law school, he sang in a band which performed in New Orleans on weekends.

Career
However, Harling never used his legal education:  skipping the bar exam, he instead moved to New York City to become an actor, auditioning for bit parts in plays and television commercials, and working as a ticket seller for Broadway shows.

After the death of his younger sister, Susan, in 1985 due to diabetes, Harling wrote a short story and adapted it into a play, Steel Magnolias, which was produced off-Broadway in 1987 to great acclaim and was subsequently translated into seventeen languages.

Harling also wrote the screenplay for the film version of the play that was produced in 1989, starring Sally Field and Julia Roberts. He played a small role in the film as a minister.

Harling went on to write more screenplays: Soapdish (1991), The First Wives Club (1996), and Laws of Attraction (2004); he also worked as an uncredited script doctor on a number of films. Harling also wrote and directed the sequel to Terms of Endearment titled The Evening Star (1996).

In the spring of 2012, he served as writer and producer of the TV show GCB, which aired briefly on ABC-TV. In the same year, it was reported that Harling was adapting Soapdish into a musical.

Personal life
He is Presbyterian He owns the Oaklawn Plantation in Natchitoches, Louisiana.

Filmography

Writer 
 1989 Steel Magnolias.
 1990 Steel Magnolias (TV pilot).
 1991 Soapdish.
 1992 Coiffure pour dames.
 1996 The First Wives Club.
 1996 The Evening Star.
 2004 Laws of Attraction.
 2012 GCB (ABC TV series).

Producer
 1997 A Smile Like Yours.
 2012 GCB (ABC TV series).

Director
 1996 The Evening Star.

References

1951 births
Living people
People from Natchitoches, Louisiana
Northwestern State University alumni
Tulane University Law School alumni
20th-century American dramatists and playwrights
American male screenwriters
American Presbyterians
American male dramatists and playwrights
20th-century American male writers
Film directors from Louisiana
Screenwriters from Louisiana
Film producers from Louisiana